The Wales Seniors Open was a golf tournament on the European Senior Tour from 2001 to 2016. The prize fund was £250,000 in 2016.

Tournament hosts
2001–05 Royal St David's Golf Club, Harlech
2006 Vale Hotel, Golf & Spa Resort, Hensol
2007–08, 2012 Conwy Golf Club, Caernarvonshire
2009–10, 2013 Royal Porthcawl Golf Club, Porthcawl
2015–16 Celtic Manor Resort, Newport

Winners

External links
Coverage on the European Senior Tour's official site

Golf tournaments in Wales
Former European Senior Tour events
Recurring sporting events established in 2001
Recurring sporting events disestablished in 2016